Ana Ibis Jiménez is a Paralympian athlete from Cuba competing mainly in category F13 long jump events.

Ana competed in the 100m at the 2004 Summer Paralympics winning a bronze medal.  She went bettered this in the same games winning the gold medal in the F13 long jump.

References

External links
 profile on paralympic.org

Paralympic athletes of Cuba
Athletes (track and field) at the 2004 Summer Paralympics
Paralympic gold medalists for Cuba
Paralympic bronze medalists for Cuba
Living people
Medalists at the 2004 Summer Paralympics
Year of birth missing (living people)
Paralympic medalists in athletics (track and field)
Cuban female long jumpers
21st-century Cuban women